Bearskin Lake may refer to:

Lakes
Canada
Bearskin Lake (British Columbia), Cassiar Land District, British Columbia
Bearskin Lake (Nova Scotia), Hants County, Nova Scotia
Bearskin Lake (Kenora District), Ontario
Bearskin Lake (Thunder Bay District), Ontario

United States
Bearskin Lake (Minnesota), Cooks County, Minnesota

Settlements
Bearskin Lake First Nation in Ontario, Canada